Harrison Charter Township is a charter township of Macomb County in the U.S. state of Michigan.  The population was 24,314 at the 2020 census.

Harrison Township was formed in 1827 in the Michigan Territory along the shores of Lake St. Clair.  The township became a charter township in 1978.

Communities
Belvidere, originally called Huron Point, was a historic settlement formed within the township in 1835 by David and James Conger from Cleveland, who bought land near the mouth of the Clinton River.  It was platted the next year and given a post office in 1837.  Many lots of land were sold to future settlers, but the area had to be abandoned after being flooded soon after in 1838.   
Harrison was a historic settlement recorded in 1859.
The community was settled around 1900 by Pittsburgh capitalists who anticipated creating a coastal city east of Mount Clemens along L'Anse Creuse Bay (French for "Little Bay"). The community never really developed on its own and merely succeeded due to its proximity to Mount Clemens.   
Liverpool is a former community located within the township along L'Anse Creuse Bay.  It began in 1856 when Edward Shook platted the village with the hopes of making it similar to Liverpool, England.  He built a hotel and a dock along the lake, but the project failed. 

Geography

The township has a coastline along the northwestern shores of Lake St. Clair.  The Clinton River has its mouth at Lake St. Clair within Harrison Township, and Lake St. Clair Metropark is also located within the township.

Selfridge Air National Guard Base, which was first built in 1917, is an Air National Guard installation that occupies a large portion of the northern section of the township.

Major highways
 runs south–north along the western edge of the township.
 enters briefly in the northwest corner of the township before having its eastern terminus at I-94.

Demographics 
As of the census of 2000, there were 24,461 people, 10,720 households, and 6,421 families residing in the township. The racial makeup of the township was 94.53% White, 2.47% African American, 0.38% Native American, 0.58% Asian, 0.04% Pacific Islander, 0.45% from other races, and 1.55% from two or more races. Hispanic or Latino of any race were 1.48% of the population.

There were 10,720 households, out of which 26.9% had children under the age of 18 living with them, 47.5% were married couples living together, 8.1% had a female householder with no husband present, and 40.1% were non-families. 33.1% of all households were made up of individuals, and 8.2% had someone living alone who was 65 years of age or older.  The average household size was 2.28 and the average family size was 2.94.

In the township the population was spread out, with 21.9% under the age of 18, 8.7% from 18 to 24, 32.5% from 25 to 44, 26.0% from 45 to 64, and 10.9% who were 65 years of age or older.  The median age was 38 years. For every 100 females, there were 101.2 males.  For every 100 females age 18 and over, there were 100.7 males.

The median income for a household in the township was $51,892, and the median income for a family was $67,129. Males had a median income of $47,444 versus $31,561 for females. The per capita income for the township was $29,491.  About 3.6% of families and 5.7% of the population were below the poverty line, including 7.0% of those under age 18 and 5.9% of those age 65 or over.

Education
The entire township is served by L'Anse Creuse Public Schools, which is headquartered in Clinton Township to the west.

Notable people

Dino Ciccarelli, retired professional ice hockey player
Uncle Kracker, singer and musician
David Legwand, retired professional ice hockey player
Candice Miller, county and state politician
Angela Ruggiero, retired professional ice hockey player and Olympian

References

Sources

External links
Harrison Charter Township official website
The Lost Villages of Harrison
Harrison Township Factsheet

Townships in Macomb County, Michigan
Charter townships in Michigan
Former census-designated places in Michigan
Michigan populated places on Lake St. Clair
Populated places established in 1827
1827 establishments in Michigan Territory